These are the Canadian number-one country albums of 1995, per the RPM Country Albums chart.

1995
1995 record charts
1995 in Canadian music